Chekhov's Motifs (translit. Chekhovskie motivy, since released in English as Chekhovian Motifs) is a 2002 Russian-Ukrainian comedy film directed by Kira Muratova. It was entered into the 24th Moscow International Film Festival. At the 2002 Russian Guild of Film Critics Awards Kira Muratova received the prize for Best Director. It is based on two works of Anton Chekhov: the short story Difficult People is divided to frame the one act play Tatyana Repina.

Cast
 Sergey Bekhterev
 Nina Ruslanova
 Natalya Buzko
 Philip Panov (as Filipp Panov)
 Zhan Daniel
 Aleksandr Bashirov
 Yuri Shlykov

References

External links
 

2002 films
2002 comedy films
Russian comedy films
Ukrainian comedy films
2000s Russian-language films
Films based on works by Anton Chekhov
Films directed by Kira Muratova